Activator may refer to:
 Activator (genetics), a DNA-binding protein that regulates one or more genes by increasing the rate of transcription
 Activator (phosphor), a type of dopant used in phosphors and scintillators
 Enzyme activator, a type of effector that increases the rate of enzyme mediated reactions
 Sega Activator, a motion-sensing controller for the Sega Mega Drive/Genesis
 Activator technique, a method of spinal adjustment
 Activator appliance, an orthodontic functional appliance

See also
 Activate (disambiguation)
 Activation